The 2000 Big Ten Conference baseball tournament was held at Siebert Field on the campus of University of Minnesota in Minneapolis, Minnesota, from May 15 through 19. The top six teams from the regular season participated in the double-elimination tournament, the nineteenth annual tournament sponsored by the Big Ten Conference to determine the league champion.  won their third tournament championship and earned the Big Ten Conference's automatic bid to the 2000 NCAA Division I baseball tournament.

Format and seeding 
The 2000 tournament was a 6-team double-elimination tournament, with seeds determined by conference regular season winning percentage only. Purdue claimed the third seed over Illinois by tiebreaker. This was the first year of the expanded six team format, with all previous years being four team events.

Tournament

All-Tournament Team 
The following players were named to the All-Tournament Team.

Most Outstanding Player 
Jason Anderson was named Most Outstanding Player. Anderson was a pitcher for Illinois.

References 

Tournament
Big Ten baseball tournament
Big Ten Baseball Tournament
Big Ten baseball tournament
College baseball tournaments in Minnesota
Baseball competitions in Minneapolis